Spidia planola is a moth in the family Drepanidae. It was described by Watson in 1965. It is found in Ivory Coast and Sierra Leone.

References

Moths described in 1965
Drepaninae